The following is a list of flags of Slovenia. For more information about the national flag, see the Flag of Slovenia.

National flag

Government flags

Political party flags

Military flags

Municipality flags

Historical flags

See also 

 Flag of Slovenia
 Coat of arms of Slovenia

References 

Flags of Slovenia
Lists and galleries of flags
Flags